BEAC Basketball is a Cameroonian basketball club based in Yaoundé. It was the basketball team of the Bank of Central African States (BEAC) and played in the Elite Messieurs, the highest level in Cameroon. In 2016, the team won the national championship. In 2018, the bank decided to shut down its basketball team due to financial trouble as there was a lot of pressure on Central African banks in that time. They returned to play in 2021.

The team played in the 2016 FIBA Africa Clubs Champions Cup where it finished in seventh place.

Honours
Elite Messieurs
Champions (5): 2002, 2003, 2009, 2016–17, 2017–18
Runners-up (3): 2006, 2008, 2015 
Cameroonian Cup
Champions (5): 2003, 2006, 2011, 2016, 2017

Notable players
 Cédric Tsangue (8 seasons: 2010–19)

References

Basketball teams in Cameroon
Basketball teams disestablished in 2018